Louisiana's 16th State Senate district is one of 39 districts in the Louisiana State Senate. It has been represented by Republican Franklin Foil since 2020.

Geography
District 16 covers south-central East Baton Rouge Parish, including parts of Baton Rouge and all of Inniswold, Oak Hills Place, Village St. George, and Westminster.

The district is located entirely within Louisiana's 6th congressional district, and overlaps with the 61st, 65th, 66th, 68th, 69th, and 70th districts of the Louisiana House of Representatives.

Recent election results
Louisiana uses a jungle primary system. If no candidate receives 50% in the first round of voting, when all candidates appear on the same ballot regardless of party, the top-two finishers advance to a runoff election.

2019

Initially, Franklin Foil and Steve Carter were exactly tied for second place, leading to a 3-way runoff election. However, following a recount, Foil was found to be the winner by 4 votes, and Carter conceded.

2015

2011

Federal and statewide results in District 16

References

Louisiana State Senate districts
East Baton Rouge Parish, Louisiana